St Oswald's Vicarage is on Parkgate Road, Chester, Cheshire, England.  It is recorded in the National Heritage List for England as a designated Grade II listed building.

History

The vicarage and attached parish room were built to serve the parish of St Oswald and the church of St Thomas of Canterbury in 1880 to a design by John Douglas.  The building now houses the English Department of Chester University. This vicarage replaced the former parish vicarages in Parsons Street (now Princess Street) and Leen Lane.

Architecture

The building is constructed in red-brown brick with Westmorland green slate roofs.  Its main front faces northeast.  The left wing has two storeys; it protrudes forward with an apsidal end.  Its lower storey contains a porch, with steps leading up to an arched door.  To the right of this is a two-storeyed section with mullioned and transomed arched windows in the lower storey, and mullioned windows in the upper storey.  Between these is a row of rectangular plaster panels.  To the right of this is a two-storeyed projection, the upper storey being set back from the lower storey.  A stair turret to the right of this has a pyramidal roof with a weather vane.  The right bay has two storeys plus an attic gable.  On the ground floor is a five-light mullioned and transomed window and above this is a five-light mullioned window.  In the gable is a three-light window surrounded by lozenge panels and brick diapering.  The parish room on the extreme right has three bays divided by buttresses and contains arched windows.

See also

Grade II listed buildings in Chester (north and west)
List of houses and associated buildings by John Douglas

References

Houses in Chester
John Douglas buildings
Grade II listed buildings in Chester
Houses completed in 1880
Clergy houses in England
Grade II listed houses